Mónica González Rivera (born September 29, 1988) is a Puerto Rican amateur female boxer from the city of Arroyo. She won a bronze medal as a flyweight for Puerto Rico at the 2015 Pan American Games held in Toronto, Ontario, Canada. A member of the Puerto Rican national women's boxing team, Gonzalez had taken up boxing only a year and a half before the Toronto Pan American Games.

Arrest
On April 14, 2018, Guayama police announced that they had arrested González, charged with attacking and hurting two people with a baseball bat, in an event that allegedly took place on April 11.

References

External links
 

1988 births
Living people
People from Arroyo, Puerto Rico
Puerto Rican women boxers
Flyweight boxers
Pan American Games medalists in boxing
Pan American Games bronze medalists for Puerto Rico
Boxers at the 2015 Pan American Games
Medalists at the 2015 Pan American Games